When I Was 17 is a MTV television show. It featured celebrities of today and looked back on "when they were 17" with pictures as well as interviews with family and friends. Celebrities on the show include Kelly Rowland, Queen Latifah, Donald Trump, Khloé Kardashian, Drake, singer Trey Songz and internet star Perez Hilton.

Topics covered
The show talked about events that lead to their present-day career. Other topics included high school and, if applicable, college, love interests, uh-oh moments, traveling, fashion, and adventures.

Episodes

Season 1 (May 1 to October 23, 2010)

 Episode 1. Khloé Kardashian, Perez Hilton & Trey Songz
 Episode 2. Ludacris, Jillian Michaels & Pete Wentz
 Episode 3. Drake, Jennie Finch & Queen Latifah 
 Episode 4. Kevin Jonas, Katharine McPhee & Bret Michaels
 Episode 5. Kourtney Kardashian, Travis McCoy & Kris Allen
 Episode 6. Evan Lysacek, Kimberly Caldwell & Gabe Saporta
 Episode 7. Nick Cannon, Aubrey O'Day & Donald Trump
 Episode 8. Vanessa Minnillo, Chris Paul & Pitbull
 Episode 9. Johnny Weir, Jackson Rathbone & Keri Hilson
 Episode 10. Nicole "Snooki" Polizzi, James Van Der Beek & Pharrell Williams
 Episode 11. Ciara, CC Sabathia & Debi Nova
 Episode 12. Jennifer Farley, Paul DelVecchio & Michael Sorrentino
 Episode 13. Holly Madison, Dwyane Wade & Benji Madden and Joel Madden
 Episode 14. Adam Levine, Kathy Griffin & Swizz Beatz
 Episode 15. Kelly Rowland, Enrique Iglesias & Stephanie Pratt
 Episode 16. Jason Derulo, Jordin Sparks & 3OH!3
 Episode 17. Kendra Wilkinson, Kelly Osbourne & Asher Roth
 Episode 18. Usher, Ne-Yo & B.o.B
 Episode 19. Joey Lawrence, Rutina Wesley & Big Boi
 Episode 20. Kristin Chenoweth, Jay Sean & Soulja Boy
 Episode 21. Best of #1
 Episode 22. Best of #2
 Episode 23. Best of #3

Season 2 (October 30, 2010 to May 14, 2011)

 Episode 24. Nelly, Karina Smirnoff & Joanna Garcia 
 Episode 25. Akon, Kerry Washington & Donald Glover
 Episode 26. Angelina Pivarnick, Nigel Barker & Nikki Blonsky
 Episode 27. Melissa Joan Hart, Flo Rida & Alison Sweeney
 Episode 28. Carmelo Anthony, Taye Diggs & Naya Rivera
 Episode 29. Audrina Patridge, Miss J. Alexander, & Cee Lo Green
 Episode 30. Vinny Guadagnino, Ronnie Ortiz-Magro & Sammi Giancola
 Episode 31. Kobe Bryant, Brooklyn Decker & Candice Accola 
 Episode 32. Jenna Ushkowitz, Patrick Stump & Deena Nicole Cortese
 Episode 33. Topher Grace, Anna Faris, & Dan Fogler
 Episode 34. Bam Margera, Kat Graham, & Olivia Munn
 Episode 35. Brandy, Jay Manuel, & Derek Hough
 Episode 36. Rob Kardashian, Padma Lakshmi & Wendy Williams
 Episode 37. Wiz Khalifa, Mark Ballas & Elizabeth Berkley
 Episode 38. Lupe Fiasco, Jessie J & Tyrese Gibson
 Episode 39. Brittany Snow, Ashley Benson & La La Anthony
 Episode 40. Ashley Fink, Jeremih & Shay Mitchell
 Episode 41. Best of Prom
 Episode 42. Questlove, Christina Perri & Vanessa Simmons
 Episode 43. Jordan Knight, Tristan Wilds & Shane West
 Episode 44. Joe Jonas, Chris Brown & Selita Ebanks

Season 3 (August 20 to November 19, 2011)

 Episode 45. Colbie Caillat, Bow Wow & Christopher Mintz-Plasse
 Episode 46. Tyler, The Creator, Kreayshawn & Big Sean
 Episode 47. Amy Lee, Chris Klein & Theophilus London
 Episode 48. Steve-O, Paris Hilton & Miguel
 Episode 49. Heidi Klum, Wyclef Jean & Ashley Rickards
 Episode 50. Jamie Foxx, Tia and Tamera Mowry & Chris Bosh
 Episode 51. Tyra Banks, Mario Lopez & Anthony Mackie
 Episode 52. Lenny Kravitz, Kristin Cavallari & Bryan Greenberg
 Episode 53. Mark Hoppus, Sean Kingston & Tiffani Thiessen
 Episode 54. AnnaLynne McCord, Estelle & Mike Posner
 Episode 55. Robyn, Chad Michael Murray & J. Cole
 Episode 56. Common, T-Pain & Alex Meraz

References

MTV original programming
2010s American reality television series
2010 American television series debuts
2011 American television series endings
Television series about teenagers